The volynka (– see also duda, and koza) is a bagpipe. Its etymology comes from the region Volyn, Ukraine, where it was borrowed from Romania.

The volynka is constructed around a goat skin air reservoir into which air is blown through a pipe with a valve to stop air escaping. (Modern concert instruments often have a reservoir made from a basketball bladder}. A number of playing pipes [two to four] extend from the reservoir holding the air. The main playing pipe on which the melody is played has five to seven, sometimes eight finger holes. The other pipes produce a drone. This is usually either a single tonic note or a perfect fifth. Each of these playing pipes has a double reed usually made from a goose quill. In the 20th century this instrument has lost the popularity it had previously, and is rarely used today in an authentic context.

Modern usage
The instrument has gained popularity in stage performance. It has been used in a number of songs by Russian rock bands DDT, Aquarium, and Aria. It also appears more in Ukrainian folk music and Russian folk music ensembles.

See also
List of bagpipes
Pilai, a Finnish bagpipe described as similar to the volynka

Sources
Humeniuk, A. - Ukrainski narodni muzychni instrumenty - Kyiv: Naukova dumka, 1967
Mizynec, V. - Ukrainian Folk Instruments - Melbourne: Bayda books, 1984
Cherkaskyi, L. - Ukrainski narodni muzychni instrumenty // Tekhnika, Kyiv, Ukraine, 2003 - 262 pages.

References

Russian folk music
Russian musical instruments
Ukrainian musical instruments
Crimean Tatar music
Bagpipes